The Giant Mechanical Man is an American dramedy film written and directed by Lee Kirk. It debuted at the 2012 Tribeca Film Festival and was distributed by Tribeca Films.

Plot

Janice (Jenna Fischer) is a woman in her 30s who has yet to learn how to navigate adulthood. Tim (Chris Messina), a devoted street artist, finds that being a silver-painted street performer doesn't pay the bills. His chosen career leads his girlfriend to break up with him. Janice is evicted from her apartment and forced to move in with her overbearing sister, Jill (Malin Åkerman). Janice receives pressure to date an egotistical self-help guru called Doug (Topher Grace). However, she meets Tim when they both end up working at the zoo.

As Janice and Tim begin working together at the zoo, they slowly develop a lighthearted connection that evolves into a quality friendship. After bumping into each other by coincidence a couple of times away from work, they eventually agree to go out on a date. The date goes exceedingly well and they end up sleeping together, then go on to develop a great connection via conversation afterward.

Janice's sister, Jill, then tries to create a relationship between Janice and Doug. Janice has no interest but ends up on a semi-forced date with Doug. Janice walks by Tim while he's in his Mechanical Man costume and does not realize it is him. As they turn the corner out of Tim's line of sight, Doug has his arm around her and finds this the opportune moment to go in for a kiss. Janice declines his advances, but Tim, unfortunately, does not see her do that. Tim is very hurt and cuts off contact with Janice, which is confusing to her since she has no idea that he saw her with Doug.

As she leaves a movie theater, where Tim was supposed to join her and meet Jill, she sees the Giant Mechanical Man again and takes the opportunity to confess her situation to him. As she continues talking, he reveals himself to be Tim, and they clasp hands as they face each other and smile.

Credits roll, and short scenes appear hinting at a happy relationship unfolding over an indeterminate period of time.

Cast
Jenna Fischer as Janice
Chris Messina as Tim
Topher Grace as Doug, a pompous motivational speaker
Malin Åkerman as Jill, Janice's sister who wants her to date Doug
Lucy Punch as Pauline, Tim's ex-girlfriend
Bob Odenkirk as Mark, Pauline's brother
Rich Sommer as Brian, Jill's significant other
Sean Gunn as George, Janice's former boss
Travis Schuldt as Hal Baker

Production
Filming began in November 2010 in Detroit, Michigan. Many scenes were shot in the Detroit Zoo.

Reception
On review aggregator Rotten Tomatoes, the film holds an approval rating of 70% based on 23 reviews, with an average rating of 5.59/10.

Variety's John Anderson gave the film a positive review, stating that the film "will meet most audiences' standards for 'charming.'" Anderson also noted that Grace's "hair-flipping delivery virtually steals the movie."

Mike McGranaghan gave the film three out of four stars, stating that "Jenna Fischer and Chris Messina do exceptional work here, making the characters immensely likable. You can relate to them even if you've never quite walked a mile in their shoes. The stars share a nice chemistry as well, creating a bond that brings real warmth to the story's emotional ending." McGranaghan noted that the film "wears its indie quirks on its sleeve a little too much. Some of those quirks feel forced, especially the stuff with Topher Grace's self-possessed creep."

References

External links
 
 

2012 comedy-drama films
2012 films
Films set in Detroit
Films shot in Michigan
American comedy-drama films
2010s English-language films
2010s American films